Mike Gunton is a British television producer and a senior executive at the BBC Natural History Unit, the world's largest production unit dedicated to wildlife film-making. In November 2009 he became the Unit's first Creative Director.

As Creative Director of BBC Studios Natural History Unit, he is responsible for bringing new and pioneering stories about the natural world to global audiences, including the BAFTA and Emmy winning Planet Earth II, which was viewed by millions worldwide. In 2018, his ground-breaking animal behaviours series, Dynasties, won a number of awards and was acclaimed by Sir David Attenborough as inventing a new genre in natural history film making. A fellow of the Royal Television Society, he also speaks internationally and is an ambassador for natural history making, BBC Studios and the natural world.  

He was the executive producer of Life, a nature documentary series which revealed the adaptive survival strategies of animals around the world, and as the co-author (with Martha Holmes) of the accompanying book. He co-directed (with Holmes) a feature film version of Life, and was the executive producer of a major BBC One series on African wildlife, broadcast in 2013.

Film and TV credits 
 The Green Planet (2022) - executive producer
 Dynasties (2018) - executive producer
 Planet Earth II (2016) - executive producer
 Life Story (2014) - executive producer
 Hidden Kingdoms (2014) - executive producer
 Africa (2013) - executive producer
 One Life (2011) - co-director
 Madagascar (2011) - executive producer
 The Great Rift: Africa's Wild Heart (2010) - executive producer
 Life (2009) - executive producer
 Yellowstone (2009) – executive producer
 Galápagos (2006) – executive producer
 Life in the Undergrowth (2005) – executive producer
 Europe: A Natural History (2005) – executive producer
 Journey of Life (2005) – executive producer
 Nile (2004) – executive producer
 British Isles: A Natural History (2004) – executive producer
 Natural World (2001-2004) – series editor
 Steve Leonard's Extreme Animals (2002) - executive producer
 Steve Leonard's Ultimate Killers (1999-2001) - executive producer
 Animal People (1997-1999) – series producer
 Violent Planet (1999) - series producer
 Tales from the Riverbank (1997) - series producer
 Natural Neighbours (1994) - series producer
 The Trials of Life (1990) – producer
 Episode "Finding Food"
 Episode "Home Making"
 Episode "Once More into the Termite Mound: The Making of The Trials of Life"

References 

Year of birth missing (living people)
Living people
BBC people
British television producers